Elbriot (Elbe riot) is an annual open air music festival in Hamburg, Germany, which features rock, heavy metal and hardcore punk bands. It is organized by Hamburg Konzerte agency.

History
The festival takes place on the compound of the Hamburg Wholesale Market. The first edition of the festival was sold out completely in a very short time with 14,000 tickets. It faced some organizational problems partly due to the high number of visitors, such as unnecessary barriers or lack of supply of drinks. In the subsequent years, a revised approach was introduced, such as a changed entrance situation and fewer barriers. The metal core band As I Lay Dying had to cancel their appearance in 2013, because their frontman Tim Lambesis was arrested shortly before. Caliban filled in during 2013, and Wovenwar, founded by three former members of As I Lay Dying, played in 2014. The second festival was overshadowed by cool temperatures, gusts of wind and some rain showers. Of Mice & Men had to cancel their appearance due to illness; Caliban played instead again. The third festival took place under extremely warm conditions, but there were no major injuries reported.

Bands
 2013: Anthrax, Betontod, Bullet for My Valentine, Caliban, Fear Factory, Killswitch Engage, Slayer, Trivium, Whitechapel
 2014: A Day to Remember, Airbourne, Amon Amarth, August Burns Red, Caliban, Graveyard, Life of Agony, Machine Head, Wovenwar
 2015: Black Stone Cherry, Blues Pills, Callejon, Enter Shikari, Eskimo Callboy, In Flames, Kreator, Kvelertak, Opeth, Vitja
 2016: Asking Alexandria, At the Gates, Carcass, Fear Factory, Mastodon, Nasty, Paradise Lost, Powerwolf, Sabaton, Slayer, Steel Panther, Testament
2017: Architects, August Burns Red, Bullet for My Valentine, Bury Tomorrow, Children of Bodom, Hatebreed, Megadeth, Trivium, Whitechapel
2018: Arch Enemy, Beartooth, Jasta, Our Mirage, Skindred, Suicidal Tendencies, Satyricon, Uncured
2019: Airbourne, Dragonforce, Hatebreed, In Flames, Jinjer, Of Mice & Men, Shvpes, Zeal & Ardor
2020: cancelled
2021: cancelled
2022: Accept, Alestorm, Bullet for My Valentine, Caliban, Fever 333, Jinjer, Kissin’ Dynamite, Our Mirage

References

External links

 Official website

Heavy metal festivals in Germany
Festivals in Hamburg
Annual events in Hamburg
Hamburg-Mitte